Haje may refer to:

Places 
 Háje (Prague Metro)
 Háje (Příbram District), a village and municipality in the Central Bohemian Region of the Czech Republic

People 
 Khrystyne Haje (born 1968), American actor
 Sydney Haje (1952–2012), Brazilian orthopedist
 Hajé Schartman (1937–2008), Dutch politician
 Haje Jan Kamps (born 1981), Dutch inventor and photojournalist

Other uses 
 An alternative name for the Egyptian cobra (Naja haje)